Almaluu (also Алмалы - Almaly) is a village in the Kemin District of Chüy Region of Kyrgyzstan. Its population was 810 in 2021.

Notable people 

 Mayramkan Abylkasymova, poet

References

Populated places in Chüy Region